Paul Ramsay  is a United States-based British-born philanthropist and computer tycoon.

Biography

Paul Ramsay was born in Birmingham, England. He graduated from Birmingham University with a BSc in Mathematics and Computer Science in 1975, an MSc in Computer Science in 1976, and a PhD in Computer Science in 1982. Ramsay worked for several computer companies after moving to California, United States, in 1983. Ramsay helped found US technology company Brocade Communications Systems in 1995.

Philanthropy
Ramsay and his wife Yuanbi, who is also a computer scientist, gave Birmingham University's School of Computer Science £1 million towards student bursaries and research. The Paul and Yuanbi Ramsay Bursaries are intended to encourage high-calibre students for whom financial considerations may prevent uptake of a place in the School of Computer Science. Paul and Yuanbi Ramsay were both appointed to the Chancellor's Guild of Benefactors at Birmingham University. The Ramsays also set up the Paul and Yuanbi Ramsay Pediatric Endowed Fellowships at Stanford University's Child Health Research Institute in the United States.

Philately
After retiring from the technology industry, Ramsay continued to pursue his lifelong interest in philately. He joined the Great Britain Philatelic Society in 2007, publishing several articles in the Society's flagship magazine The GB Journal, winning the Literature Field Award in 2016 for the most significant published work by a Society member in the field of GB Philately. In 2014 he became editor of the Society's general information magazine The GBPS Newsletter. Ramsay also joined the Royal Philatelic Society London as a member and was later elected a Fellow of the RPSL. In May 2018 he donated his collection of hand-painted envelopes to be auctioned by Spink on behalf of the RPSL. The auction raised £175,000 for the Tomorrow's Royal campaign.

References

Living people
Alumni of the University of Birmingham
British philanthropists
British philatelists
British computer scientists
1953 births